Tadeusz Dolny (born 7 May 1958) is a retired Polish football player and his last international game for Poland was against Germany.

He played for a few clubs, including Górnik Zabrze and Górnik Wałbrzych.

He played for the Polish national team (7 matches) and was a participant at the 1982 FIFA World Cup, where Poland won the bronze medal.

References

Family

1958 births
Living people
Polish footballers
Górnik Zabrze players
1982 FIFA World Cup players
Poland international footballers
People from Sobótka
Sportspeople from Lower Silesian Voivodeship
Association football defenders
Górnik Wałbrzych players